Hrach Hovhannisyan (28 May 1987) is an Armenian Greco-Roman wrestler.

Hovhannisyan was a member of the Armenian Greco-Roman wrestling team at the 2013 Wrestling World Cup. The Armenian team came in fourth place. Hovhannisyan personally won a bronze medal.

References

Living people
Armenian male sport wrestlers
1987 births
21st-century Armenian people